Planet M.U.L.E. is an online multiplayer strategy game by Swedish studio Turborilla.  It is a remake of the 1983 video game M.U.L.E.

Gameplay 

The gameplay of Planet M.U.L.E. closely follows that of the original M.U.L.E.. Improvements over the original include improved, animated graphics and network play over the Internet.  However, in the original game, the different characters had different advantages during gameplay (for example, Packers were better at producing food), whereas in Planet M.U.L.E. there are no advantages to choosing one character type versus another.  The game is available for Microsoft Windows, Mac OS X, and Linux.

Development 

The game was initially produced as an unofficial remake, though early on the developers sought and obtained the consent of Melanie Bunten Stark, daughter of M.U.L.E.'s designer Danielle Bunten Berry.

References

See also
 Subtrade
 Traders (video game)

External links
 

2009 video games
Multiplayer video games
M.U.L.E.
Linux games
Windows games
MacOS games
Video game clones
Video games developed in Sweden